The 2018 Tocantins gubernatorial special election was summoned by the Superior Electoral Court after the decision that removed the Governor and Vice Governor of Tocantins, who won the 2014 election, by the allegation of abuse of economic power. In the face of such sentence, the President of the Legislative Assembly, Mauro Carlesse, took office as Acting Governor until a new voting decided who would command the state government. Altogether, seven candidacies were registered for the election. Carlesse ran for Governor and defeated Senator Vicentinho Alves in the second round with more than 75% of the valid votes. The term of Carlesse ends on 1 January 2019, when the Governor-elect in the October election will take office.

Candidates

Candidates in runoff

Candidates failing to make runoff

Candidacy denied

Debates

First round

Second round

Results

References

2018 Brazilian gubernatorial elections
June 2018 events in South America
Special elections in Brazil
Tocantins gubernatorial elections